Viceversa (English: Viceversa) is the 14th studio album recorded by Puerto Rican salsa singer Gilberto Santa Rosa, It was released by Sony Music Latin on September 3, 2002. The album became his fourth number-one set on the Billboard Tropical Albums chart. The album received a nomination a Latin Grammy Award for Best Salsa Album and the single "Por Más Qué Intento" received a Latin Grammy Award for Best Tropical Song in the 4th Annual Latin Grammy Awards on September 3, 2003.

Track listing
This information adapted from Allmusic.

Chart performance

Certification

See also
List of number-one Billboard Tropical Albums from the 2000s

References

2002 albums
Gilberto Santa Rosa albums
Sony Discos albums
Spanish-language albums
Albums produced by Kike Santander